Bagrat Vika Yesayan ( of Yerevan, Armenia born June 8, 1965) is Chairman of the Eurasia Regional Scout Committee as well as one of 12 elected volunteer members of the World Scout Committee, the main executive body of the World Organization of the Scout Movement.

Yesayan graduated from Yerevan State University in 1988. Yesayan is married, a member of the Armenian Revolutionary Federation (ARF), and the editor-in-chief of Yerkir Daily newspaper.

See also

References

External links
https://www.youtube.com/watch?v=0DeRjlSEdyc Asbarez with Bagrat Yesayan (interview in Armenian)
http://armenianweekly.com/2015/12/03/demonstrations-against-reforms/bagrat-yesayan/ (interview missing, image)

World Scout Committee members
Scouting and Guiding in Armenia
Living people
Eurasia Scout Committee members
Year of birth missing (living people)